Chongkham H.Q. is a village in the Chongkham sub-district of Namsai District in Arunachal Pradesh, India. According to the 2011 Census of India it had 1,085 residents in 292 households. 487 were male and 598 were female.

References 

Villages in Lohit district